Juanita Elizabeth Jackson Mitchell (January 2, 1913 – July 7, 1992) was born in Hot Springs, Arkansas, and was the first African-American woman to practice law in Maryland. She was married to Clarence M. Mitchell, Jr., mother of two Maryland State Senators, and grandmother of one.

Background

The daughter of Kieffer Albert Jackson and Lillie Mae Carroll Jackson, Mitchell attended Frederick Douglass High School, Morgan State College and graduated, cum laude, from the University of Pennsylvania with a B.S. in education in 1931. Four years later, she earned a M.A. in sociology from the University of Pennsylvania as well. In 1950, she became the first African-American woman to graduate from the University of Maryland School of Law, and the first African-American woman to practice law in Maryland.

Career
In her earlier years, Mitchell traveled extensively throughout the U.S. for the Bureau of Negro Work and the Methodist church, speaking and teaching courses in race relations. From 1935 to 1938, she was special assistant to Walter F. White, NAACP Executive Secretary, serving as National Youth Director. There, she organized and developed programs for the organization's Youth and College Division. Mitchell was the president of Maryland's NAACP Baltimore City branch when she advocated for Baltimore school desegregation and after the 1954 United States Supreme Court case, Brown v. Board of Education, she was a major campaigner for making Maryland the first southern state to have integration. She also filed many other cases to desegregate numerous other aspects of segregated life including restaurants, parks and swimming pools. Mitchell also ran voter registration drives in the 1940s, '50s and '60s to help influence and rally African Americans in Baltimore to vote.

Mitchell founded the Baltimore City-Wide Young People's Forum in 1931, and the NAACP Youth Movement in 1935. In 1942, she directed a march on Maryland's Capitol with 2,000 citizens as well as the first citywide "Register and Vote" campaign. The campaign resulted in 11,000 new voter registrations on the books. In 1958, she directed the NAACP's "Register to Vote" campaign which resulted in over 20,000 new registrations.
  
Mitchell was also recognized in the political arena for being a crusader and leader. She was named to the White House Conference on "Women and Civil Rights" by John F. Kennedy and in 1966 she was appointed by President Lyndon B. Johnson to the White House Conference "To Fulfill These Rights" which dealt with finding solutions concerning African Americans in relation to economic security, education and justice. In 1987, Mitchell was inducted, along with her mother, into the Maryland Women's Hall of Fame. The NAACP has also recognized Juanita Jackson Mitchell for her accomplishments and has created a "Juanita Jackson Mitchell Award for Legal Activism" to honor her feats as a black woman in the legal field.

Mitchell family
In 1938, Mitchell married Clarence M. Mitchell, Jr., who was known nationally for being a civil rights activist, being dubbed "the 101st Senator." She was the daughter of Dr. Lillie Jackson, who was also a major civil rights leader and who also was president of the NAACP Baltimore branch and was known as "Mother of Freedom." Juanita Jackson Mitchell came from a long line of civil activists and continued the line. She was the mother of former state senators Michael B. Mitchell and Clarence M. Mitchell, III. Her Grandson, Clarence M. Mitchell, IV was a Member of the Maryland House of Delegates and then a Member of the Maryland State Senate. Her grandson, Keiffer J. Mitchell, Jr., was a member of the Baltimore City Council and ran for Mayor of Baltimore in 2007. Juanita Mitchell was rendered a quadriplegic in November 1989 after falling down a flight of stairs. While undergoing therapy for that injury, she suffered a stroke, her second since 1985; she was 79. Juanita Jackson Mitchell died in Baltimore of a heart attack and complications from the strokes in July 1992.

Legacy
Each year, the NAACP, at its National Convention, awards the Juanita Jackson Mitchell Legal Activism Award to an NAACP Unit for exemplary legal redress committee activities.

See also 
 List of first women lawyers and judges in Maryland

References 

1913 births
1992 deaths
NAACP activists
Women in Maryland politics
African-American women lawyers
African-American lawyers
20th-century American lawyers
Mitchell family of Maryland
People from Hot Springs, Arkansas
20th-century American women lawyers